The 2014 Stockholm Open was a professional men's tennis tournament played on indoor hard courts.  It was the 46th edition of the tournament, and part of the ATP World Tour 250 series of the 2014 ATP World Tour. It took place at the Kungliga tennishallen in Stockholm, Sweden between 13 and 19 October 2014.

Singles main-draw entrants

Seeds

 1 Rankings are as of October 6, 2014

Other entrants
The following players received wildcards into the singles main draw:
  Christian Lindell
  Patrik Rosenholm
  Elias Ymer

The following players received entry from the qualifying draw:
  Matthias Bachinger
  Dustin Brown
  Marius Copil
  Pierre-Hugues Herbert

Withdrawals
Before the tournament
  Nick Kyrgios
  Lu Yen-hsun
  Gaël Monfils
  Édouard Roger-Vasselin

Doubles main-draw entrants

Seeds

 Rankings are as of October 6, 2014

Other entrants
The following pairs received wildcards into the doubles main draw:
  Dustin Brown /  Andreas Siljeström
  Johan Brunström /  Nicholas Monroe

Finals

Singles

  Tomáš Berdych defeated  Grigor Dimitrov, 5–7, 6–4, 6–4

Doubles

  Eric Butorac /  Raven Klaasen defeated  Treat Huey /  Jack Sock, 6–4, 6–3

References

External links
 Official website 

If Stockholm Open
Stockholm Open
 
Stockholm Open
Stockholm Open
2010s in Stockholm